Ciudad Obregón International Airport  is an international airport located 15 kilometers (9.3 miles) to the southeast of the center of Ciudad Obregón, Sonora, Mexico. It has one terminal with three gates and two jetways. There are two additional parking spaces for commercial aircraft. The airport is operated by Aeropuertos y Servicios Auxiliares, a federal government-owned corporation. The airport first came under management by Aeropuertos y Serviciois Auxiliares in 1965 after the corporation was first created to manage airport terminals in Mexico.

In 2021, the airport handled 355,302 passengers, and in 2022 it handled 430,276 passengers.

Airlines and destinations

Passenger

Statistics

Passengers

Busiest routes

See also 

List of the busiest airports in Mexico

References

External links
 Ciudad Obregón Intl. Airport

Airports in Sonora